Remodeling and spacing factor 1 is a protein that in humans is encoded by the RSF1 gene.

HBXAP is involved in transcription repression, transcription coactivation when associated with hepatitis B virus X protein (HBX), and chromatin remodeling and spacing when associated with SNF2H (MIM 603375).[supplied by OMIM]

References

Further reading